Wiktor Herman "Kulörten" Andersson (19 June 1887 – 13 September 1966) was a Swedish film actor. He appeared in more than 160 films between 1923 and 1958.

Selected filmography

 Boman at the Exhibition (1923)
 A Stolen Waltz (1932)
 Marriageable Daughters (1933)
 Two Men and a Widow (1933)
 What Do Men Know? (1933)
 Fired (1934)
 The People of Småland (1935)
 Under False Flag (1935)
 Ocean Breakers (1935)
 The Wedding Trip (1936)
 Conscientious Objector Adolf (1936)
 The Family Secret (1936)
 Sara Learns Manners (1937)
 Good Friends and Faithful Neighbours (1938)
 We at Solglantan (1939)
 The People of Högbogården (1939)
 Västkustens hjältar (1940)
 Her Melody (1940)
 With Open Arms (1940)
 Woman on Board (1941)
 The Ghost Reporter (1941)
 Goransson's Boy (1941)
 Dunungen (1941)
 Lasse-Maja (1941)
 Only a Woman (1941)
 The Poor Millionaire (1941)
 Nothing Is Forgotten (1942)
 Adventurer (1942)
 Men of the Navy (1943)
 In Darkest Smaland (1943)
 She Thought It Was Him (1943)
 The Sixth Shot (1943)
 Count Only the Happy Moments (1944)
 The Old Clock at Ronneberga (1944)
 Kungliga patrasket (1945)
 Oss tjuvar emellan eller En burk ananas (1945)
 Crisis (1946)
 Harald the Stalwart (1946)
 Evening at the Djurgarden (1946)
 The Bells of the Old Town (1946)
 Affairs of a Model (1946)
 Don't Give Up (1947)
 Kvarterets olycksfågel (1947)
 The Bride Came Through the Ceiling (1947)
 Crime in the Sun (1947)
 The Girl from the Marsh Croft (1947)
 A Swedish Tiger (1948)
 Private Bom (1948)
 Loffe the Tramp (1948)
 Sunshine (1948)
 Loffe as a Millionaire (1948)
 The Swedish Horseman (1949)
 Playing Truant (1949)
 Dangerous Spring (1949)
 The Street (1949)
 Two Stories Up (1950)
 Andersson's Kalle (1950)
 The Motor Cavaliers (1950)
 The Kiss on the Cruise (1950)
 When Love Came to the Village (1950)
 Customs Officer Bom (1951)
 Beef and the Banana (1951)
Living on 'Hope' (1951)
 Love (1952)
 Defiance (1952)
 The Clang of the Pick (1952)
 Say It with Flowers (1952)
 Blondie, Beef and the Banana (1952)
 For the Sake of My Intemperate Youth (1952)
 Åsa-Nisse on Holiday (1953)
 The Chieftain of Göinge (1953)
 The Shadow (1953)
 All the World's Delights (1953)
 Time of Desire (1954)
 Young Summer (1954)
 The People of Hemsö (1955)
 Tarps Elin (1956)
 Woman in a Fur Coat (1958)
 Åsa-Nisse in Military Uniform (1958)
 Laila (1958)
 The Jazz Boy (1958)
 The Great Amateur (1958)

References

External links

1887 births
1966 deaths
Swedish male film actors
People from Kungsbacka
20th-century Swedish male actors